Cernina fluctuata, common name the wavy moon snail, is a species of marine gastropod mollusc in the family Ampullinidae. It is the only living member of its family.

Description
The shells of this species range in size from 25 to 80 mm.

This species resembles the moon snails of the family Naticidae, though it is not related. One way to differentiate this shell from that of true moon snails is by its lack of an umbilical callus. The color pattern is one of wavy or zigzag stipes crossing the width of the shell.

Distribution
This species is native to the Philippines and northern Borneo.

Diet
Cernina fluctuata is an herbivore that grazes on algae. This is in contrast to true moon snails, which are predators.

References

Bruno Caze, Didier Merle, Mathieu Le Meur, Jean-Michel Pacaud, Daniel Ledon and Jean-Paul Saint Martin. (2011) "Taxonomic implications of the residual colour patterns of ampullinid gastropods and their contribution to the discrimination from naticids." Acta Palaeontologica Polonica 56 (2): 329–347. doi: 10.4202/app.2009.0084

External links 

Ampullinidae